The Centennial, also known as the SBC Publishing Building or 100 North Center, is a tall office building in Troy, Michigan. It is located at 100 E. Big Beaver Road,

The high-rise was built in 1981 and finished in 1983. It stands at 16 stories in total height, with 15 above-ground floors, and 1 basement floor. Official measurements state that the building stands 207 ft (63m) in total height.  The building is used for offices for SBC, and was designed in the modern architectural style.

Description 
 Owner/Management: Redico Real Estate Development (REDICO)
 This building is shaped like a parallelogram.

External links 
 Google Maps location of the SBC Publishing Building
 
 

Skyscrapers in Troy, Michigan
Skyscraper office buildings in Michigan

Office buildings completed in 1983